Šemovec  is a village in Varaždin County, Croatia.

The village is located near the Drava, around 10 kilometres east of Varaždin, and belongs to the Trnovec Bartolovečki municipality. Its population in the 2011 census was 916.

The D2 state road goes through the village, and there is also a portion of the A4 motorway passing through nearby, between Šemovec and Zamlaka.

Šemovec has one public elementary school.

References

Populated places in Varaždin County